The following lists events that happened during 1958 in Chile.

Incumbents
President of Chile: Carlos Ibáñez del Campo (until 3 November), Jorge Alessandri

Events 
January–June – Snipe incident

March
3 March - The national identity card is created. To avoid fraud, the document must always bear all the names (they can be 1, 2, 3, or even 4), the surnames of both parents (in the old days, if the father did not recognize the child, he or she had to bear the mother's first surname as both surnames), nationality (Chile or another country), date of birth (any) and the Unique National Role or RUN.

August
5 August – The Law of Permanent Defense of Democracy is repealed.

September
4 September – Chilean presidential election, 1958 and The Las Melosas earthquake occurs in Cajón del Maipo, with an intensity of 7.3 degrees on the Richter scale. There were 4 people dead, 35 injured and 175 homeless.

November
1 November - Ladeco, an airline established at the Los Cerrillos Airport, in Santiago, is inaugurated.
3 November - Assumes as President of Chile, Jorge Alessandri, whose term will last until November 3, 1964.

Births
10 January – Fernando Santis
13 January – Ricardo Acuña
22 April – Jorge Orlando Aravena Plaza
29 April – Carlos Ramos (Chilean footballer)
21 June – Raúl Ormeño
28 July – Alejandro Silva (athlete)
12 August – Pablo Longueira
18 August – Edgardo Fuentes
12 September – Sergio Salgado
15 November – Oscar Rojas (Chilean footballer)
8 December – Alejandra Ramos

Deaths
11 November – Germán Ignacio Riesco (b. 1888)

References 

 
Years of the 20th century in Chile
Chile